KNNR (1400 AM) is a commercial radio station based in Reno, Nevada. It is owned and operated by Fred Weinberg, through licensee 1400 Investments, LLC. It is a full-time satellite of KELY in Ely.

History

KBDB came to air in 2000 and eventually broadcast a smooth jazz format. After two months off the air, KBDB became KNNR in 2012 with taped city hearings and for a time, The Savage Nation, which was moved back to KKOH and later discontinued.

In September 2013, the station began airing Regional Mexican programming via MVS Radio's La Mejor network. At the start of 2017, it switched to a full-time simulcast of sister station KELY, which airs on three other stations in Northern Nevada. They are collectively branded as the "Nevada Talk Network."

KNNR (alongside satellite partner KELY) is the local Reno radio partner for the Vegas Golden Knights of the National Hockey League.

References

External links

News and talk radio stations in the United States
Radio stations established in 2000
NNR